Mani Kumar Chetri (born 23 May 1920) is an Indian cardiologist, a former director of West Bengal State Health Services and a former director of the IPGMER and SSKM Hospital, Kolkata. He is an elected fellow of the National Academy of Medical Sciences and a recipient of the fourth highest Indian civilian award of Padma Shri from the Government of India in 1974.

Biography

Mani Kumar Chetri was born on 23 May 1920 in Teesta Valley T.E., one of the oldest tea gardens situated on the banks of Teesta River in Darjeeling in the Indian state of West Bengal, in a gorkha family to P. L. Singh Chettri and H. M. Chettri. He did his early schooling at the Darjeeling Municipal Primary School and Turnbull High School and completed his matriculation from the Government High School, Darjeeling in 1936. After passing his intermediate examination from St. Paul's Cathedral Mission College, Kolkata, he secured a graduate degree in medicine (MBBS) from the Government Medical College, Calcutta and the degree of FRCP from London on government scholarship in 1956.

Chetri joined the IPGMER and SSKM Hospital in 1960 as the director and a professor of the department of cardiology. In 1976, he was appointed as the Director of West Bengal Health Services in 1976 and served as the personal doctor of the then chief minister, Jyoti Basu. In 1997, when the Advanced Medical Research Institute was started in Dhakuria, Chetri was made the managing director, but he continued his association with PGIMER as an advisor. The Government of India awarded him the civilian honor of Padma Shri in 1974.

See also

 AMRI Hospitals

References

1920 births
Living people
Recipients of the Padma Shri in medicine
Indian cardiologists
Indian Gorkhas
People from Darjeeling district
Medical doctors from West Bengal
St. Paul's Cathedral Mission College alumni
University of Calcutta alumni
Fellows of the National Academy of Medical Sciences
Indian medical academics
20th-century Indian medical doctors